Yaël Eisden (born 11 January 1994) is a Curaçaoan professional footballer. He also holds Dutch citizenship.

Club career
He made his professional debut in the Eerste Divisie for Sparta Rotterdam on 14 August 2015 in a game against RKC Waalwijk. In 2018, he transferred as a free agent on a 1.5 year contract to the Latvian higher division club FK Jelgava. In 2020 Eisden played for Platanias F.C. In 2021 he signed with ASWH. He moved to SV TEC after the winter break.

References

External links
 

1994 births
Dutch people of Curaçao descent
Living people
Curaçao footballers
Curaçao expatriate footballers
Curaçao youth international footballers
Footballers from Rotterdam
Sparta Rotterdam players
Helmond Sport players
RKC Waalwijk players
FK Jelgava players
Platanias F.C. players
Eerste Divisie players
Latvian Higher League players
Super League Greece 2 players
Association football midfielders
Expatriate footballers in Latvia
Expatriate footballers in Greece
ASWH players
Tweede Divisie players